Andres Petrov (born 15 October 1996) is an Estonian professional snooker player. He is the first professional snooker player from Estonia. Petrov turned professional at the start of the 2022/23 season after winning the EBSA European Snooker Championship.

Early life and education
Andres Petrov was born in Tallinn. His father, Boriss Petrov, is a youth ice hockey coach. Petrov graduated from Tallinn High School of Humanities in 2015 and from Tallinn University, with a degree in youth work in 2018.

Career
Petrov started playing snooker in 2009. In 2017 he reached the final of the EBSA European Snooker Championship for the first time, where he lost 7-3 to Chris Totten, and notably reached the last 64 of the 2019 Riga Masters as an amateur. He turned professional in 2022 after winning the European Snooker Championship with a 5-3 victory over Ben Mertens in the final.

Performance and rankings timeline

Career finals

Amateur finals: 12 (11 titles)

References

1996 births
Living people
Snooker players
Sportspeople from Tallinn
Tallinn University alumni
Estonian people of Russian descent
21st-century Estonian people